Hammira is a Sanskritized form the Arabic title Amir, adopted as a given name by the early medieval Indian rulers. It may refer to:

 Hammiradeva (r. c. 1283-1301), a king of the Chahamana dynasty of north-western India
 Hammira Mahakavya, 15th-century Sanskrit epic about the king
 Hamir Raso, 18th or 19th-century Hindi poem about the king
 Hameer Hath, 1964 Indian Hindi-language film about the king by Jaswant Jhaveri
 Hammiravarman (r. c. 1288-1311), a king of the Chandela dynasty of central India
 Hammir Singh (r. c. 1314-1378), a king of the Sisodia dynasty of Mewar in north-western India
 Hamir Singh II, maharana of Mewar from 1772–1778
Bir Hambir, 49th king of Mallabhum
Hambirrao Mohite, military commander of the Maratha Empire
 A common title used for the invading Muslim kings in early medieval Indian Sanskrit texts

See also
Hamir (disambiguation)
Hamira, town in Kapurthala, Punjab, India
Hamira railway station
Hameer, a Hindustani classical raga
Hamirpur (disambiguation)
Suratrana, Sanskrit transliteration of sultan
Balhara (title), Arabic transliteration of Sanskrit Vallabha